Glyphostoma alliteratum is a species of sea snail, a marine gastropod mollusk in the family Clathurellidae.

Description
The shell grows to a length of 5 mm.

Distribution
This marine species is distributed along the Gulf of Carpentaria, Queensland, the Great Barrier Reef, New South Wales

References

External links
 

alliteratum
Gastropods described in 1915